Scorpaena papillosa, the red rock cod, Southern red scorpionfish, chained scorpionfish, common red gurnard, Southern red scorpioncod, Southern rockcod or dwarf scorpionfish, is a species of venomous marine ray-finned fish belonging to the family Scorpaenidae, the scorpionfishes.

Taxonomy
Scorpaena papillosa was first formally described in 1801 as Synanceia papillosus by the German naturalists Johann Gottlob Schneider and Johann Reinhold Forster with the type locality given as Matatuahu Point on the Tāwharanui Peninsula in the Hauraki Gulf of North Auckland on the North Island of New Zealand. The specific name papillosa means "papilose", a reference to the tentacles on the pored cells along the lateral line.

Subspecies
Scorpaena papillosa is divided into 2 subspecies:

Description
Scorpaena papillosa grows to a maximum length of approximately 30 cm. Its large mouth contains small, thin teeth that form velvety bands (villiform). It has 12 dorsal spines, 9 to 10 dorsal soft rays, 3 anal spines, 5 anal soft rays, a small row of spines beneath the eyes, and a gill cover margin containing 3 spines.

Distribution
This species is found in the Indo-West Pacific, in New Zealand and southern Australia.

Habitat
It can be found on rocky bottoms, in shallow estuaries, in muddy waters as well as other environments, such as in offshore kelp beds and shallow seagrass beds. Juveniles of this species are sometimes found in large rock pools.

Diet
This fish feeds on many different invertebrates, including crustaceans. It also eats other fish.

References

External links
 Image

papillosa
Fish described in 1801